Barbara Fantechi is an Italian mathematician and Professor at the International School for Advanced Studies. Her research area is algebraic geometry. She is a member of the Accademia dei Lincei.

Early life and education
Fantechi received her Laurea from the University of Pisa in 1988, with thesis Secanti di varietà proiettive e applicazioni. Her doctoral advisor was Fabrizio Catanese.

Research and career 
Her research considers algebraic geometry. She has developed the mathematical theories that underpin algebraic stacks. Stacks were first introduced to understand the moduli space of curves.

Honours and awards 
In 2018, Fantechi received the Prof. Luigi Tartufari award from the Accademia dei Lincei. She was awarded the MSRI Chancellor's Professorship for 2017-2018, and spent a year at the University of California, Berkeley. In 2022, Fantechi was the first woman mathematician to become a member of the Accademia dei Lincei.

Publications

References

External links

1966 births
Living people
20th-century Italian mathematicians
Italian women mathematicians
20th-century women mathematicians
21st-century women mathematicians
21st-century Italian mathematicians
University of Pisa alumni
Algebraic geometers
20th-century Italian women
21st-century Italian women